Strathy Hay (10 May 1897 – 5 April 1973) was a Canadian rower. He competed in the men's coxed four event at the 1920 Summer Olympics.

References

External links
 

1897 births
1973 deaths
Canadian male rowers
Olympic rowers of Canada
Rowers at the 1920 Summer Olympics
Rowers from Toronto
20th-century Canadian people